The ancient Kingdom of Awsān in South Arabia, modern-day Yemen, with a capital at Ḥajar Yaḥirr in Wādī Markhah, to the south of Wādī Bayḥān, is now marked by a tell or artificial mound, which is locally named Ḥajar Asfal. Once it was one of the most important small kingdoms of South Arabia. The city seems to have been destroyed in the 7th century BCE by the king and Mukarrib of Saba' Karab El Watar, according to a Sabaean text that reports the victory in terms that attest to its significance for the Sabaeans.

History

First impressions in the mid-1990s, based on ceramics found by M. Saad Ayoub at the unexcavated site, date a resurgence of the city to the end of the 2nd century BCE lasting until the beginning of the 1st century CE (which corresponds quite well to the epigraphic data attesting the only deified South Arabian king that was just the king of Awsān precisely around this time). About 160,000 m² were encircled by walls, and the foundations of dwellings built of fired brick have been noted. Culture depended on annual flood irrigation in spring and summer, when flash floods down the wadis temporarily flooded the fields, leaving light silt that has since been wind-eroded, revealing the ancient patterns of fields and ditches. Radiocarbon dating of irrigation sediments in the environs suggest that essential irrigation was abandoned in the first half of the 1st century CE, and the population dispersed. This time the site was never rebuilt. 

Hagar Yahirr was the center of an exceptionally large city for South Arabia, influenced by Hellenistic culture, with temples and a palace structure surrounded by mudbrick dwellings, with a probable site for a souq or market and a caravanserai serving camel caravans. One of its kings at this period was the only Yemeni ruler to be  accorded divine honours; his surviving portrait statuette is dressed in Greek fashion, contrasting with those of his predecessors who are dressed in Arabian style, with kilt and shawl. There are Awsān inscriptions, in the Qatabānian language.  

The siting of Ḥajar Yaḥirr is consistent with other capitals of petty kingdoms, at the mouths of large wādīs: Ma`īn in the Wādī al-Jawf, Ma'rib in Wādī Dana, Timna in Wādī Bayhān, and Shabwah in Wādī 'Irmah.

External links
Télédetection archéologique dans la Wadi Markha (in French)
Caravan Kingdoms: Yemen and the Ancient Incense Trade Freer Gallery, Washington, 2005. Exhibition of archeological objects from Yemen, setting Awsan in context. Catalogue.
Robert Hoyland, Arabia and the Arabs: From the Bronze Age to the Coming of Islam (series Ancient Peoples)
Freya Stark and Jane Geniesse The Southern Gates of Arabia: A Journey in the Hadhramaut

Ancient history of Yemen
Awsan
Awsan
South Arabia